The 2002 4 Nations Cup was the seventh playing of the annual women's ice hockey tournament. It was held in Kitchener and Mississauga, Ontario, from November 6–10, 2002.

Results

Final Table

Final

3rd place

External links
Tournament on hockeyarchives.info

2002
2002–03 in Finnish ice hockey
2002–03 in Swedish ice hockey
2002–03 in Canadian women's ice hockey
2002–03 in American women's ice hockey
2002–03
2002–03 in women's ice hockey